Charles Francis Adams Sr. (August 18, 1807 – November 21, 1886) was an American historical editor, writer, politician, and diplomat. As United States Minister to the United Kingdom during the American Civil War, Adams was crucial to Union efforts to prevent British recognition of the Confederate States of America and maintain European neutrality to the utmost extent. Adams also featured in national and state politics before and after the Civil War.

Adams was the patriarch of one of the United States's most prominent political families: his father and grandfather were Presidents John Quincy Adams and John Adams, about whom he wrote a major biography. He had seven children, including John Quincy II, Charles Jr., Henry, and Brooks.

Adams served two terms in the Massachusetts State Senate before helping to found the abolitionist Free Soil Party in 1848; he was the party's vice-presidential candidate in the election of 1848 on a ticket with former president Martin Van Buren. He was elected to the United States House of Representatives in 1858 and re-elected in 1860.

During the Civil War, Adams served as the United States Minister to the United Kingdom under Abraham Lincoln, where he played a key role in keeping the British government neutral and not diplomatically recognizing the Confederacy. After the War, he became alienated from the Republican Party and was successively a Liberal Republican, Anti-Mason, and Democrat. In 1876, he was the unsuccessful Democratic nominee for Governor of Massachusetts.

Adams became an overseer of Harvard University and built the Stone Library at Peacefield, the Adams' family home which is now part of the Adams National Historical Park in Quincy, Massachusetts, to honor his father.

Early life
Adams was born in Boston on August 18, 1807, and he was one of three sons and a daughter born to John Quincy Adams (1767–1848) and Louisa Catherine Johnson (1775–1852).  His older brothers were George Washington Adams (1801–1829) and John Adams II (1803–1834).  His sister, Louisa, was born in 1811 but died in 1812 while the family was in Russia. He was named in part after Francis Dana.

He attended Boston Latin School and Harvard College, where he graduated in 1825. He then studied law with Daniel Webster, attained admission to the bar, and practiced in Boston. He wrote numerous reviews of works about American and British history for the North American Review.

During the presidency of his father John Quincy Adams (1825–1829), Charles and his brothers John and George were all rivals for the same woman, their cousin Mary Catherine Hellen, who lived with the Adams family after the death of her parents.  In 1828, John married Mary in a White House ceremony, and both Charles and George declined to attend.

Career

In 1840, Adams was elected to three one-year terms in the Massachusetts House of Representatives and he served in the Massachusetts Senate from 1843 to 1845.  In 1846, he purchased and became editor of the Boston Whig newspaper.  In 1848, he was the unsuccessful nominee of the Free Soil Party for Vice President of the United States, running on a ticket with former president Martin Van Buren as the presidential nominee. That same year, his father died from a stroke at age 80.

From the 1840s, Adams became one of the finest historical editors of his era. He developed his expertise in part because of the example of his father, who in 1829 had turned from politics (after his defeated bid for a second presidential term in 1828) to history and biography. John Quincy Adams began a biography of his father, John Adams, but wrote only a few chapters before resuming his political career in 1830 with his election to the U.S. House of Representatives. 

The younger Adams, fresh from his edition of the letters of his grandmother Abigail Adams, Letters of Mrs. Adams, the Wife of John Adams (1840), took up the project that his father had left uncompleted and between 1850 and 1856 turned out not just the two volumes of the biography but eight further volumes presenting editions of John Adams's Diary and Autobiography, his major political writings, and a selection of letters and speeches. The edition, titled The Works of John Adams, Esq., Second President of the United States, was the only edition of John Adams's writings until the family donated the cache of Adams papers to the Massachusetts Historical Society in 1854 and authorized the creation of the Adams Papers project; the modern project had published accurate scholarly editions of John Adams's diary and autobiography, several volumes of Adams family correspondence, two volumes on the portraits of John and Abigail Adams and John Quincy and Louisa Catherine Adams, and the early years of the diary of Charles Francis Adams, who published a revised edition of the biography in 1871. He was elected a Fellow of the American Academy of Arts and Sciences in 1857.

Congressman and diplomat
As a Republican, Adams was elected to the United States House of Representatives in 1858, where he chaired the Committee on Manufactures. He was re-elected in 1860 but resigned to become U.S. minister (ambassador) to the Court of St James's (Britain), a post previously held by his father and grandfather, from 1861 to 1868. Powerful Massachusetts Senator Charles Sumner had wanted the position and so became alienated from Adams. Britain had already recognized Confederate belligerency, but Adams was instrumental in maintaining British neutrality and preventing British diplomatic recognition of the Confederacy during the American Civil War.

Part of his duties included corresponding with British civilians, including Karl Marx and the International Workingmen's Association. Adams and his son, Henry Adams, who served as his private secretary, also were kept busy monitoring Confederate diplomatic intrigues and the construction of rebel commerce raiders by British shipyards (like hull N°290, launched as  Enrica from Liverpool but was soon transformed near the Azores Islands into sloop-of-war CSS Alabama).

His main success as a diplomat was in keeping Britain neutral. He helped resolve the Trent Affair in 1861, in which an American naval officer had violated British rights. With the Union blockade of Confederate ports growing increasingly successful, little cotton now reached Europe except through Union channels. A strong element in Britain, including Chancellor of the Exchequer William Gladstone, wanted to intervene to help the Confederacy. Adams warned doing so would mean war with the United States, as well as the cutting off American food exports, which constituted about a fourth of the British food supply. The American Navy, increasingly strong, would try to sink British shipping.

The British government pulled back from talk of war when the Confederate invasion of the North was defeated at Antietam, and Lincoln announced that he would issue the Emancipation Proclamation. Adams and his staff collected details on the shipbuilding issue, showing how warships built for the Confederacy caused widespread damage to the American merchant marine. The evidence became the basis of the postwar Alabama Claims. The claims went to arbitration, with Adams in charge of the American side. The British in 1872 agreed to pay $15 million in damages.

Meeting with Joseph Smith 
In 1844, while traveling with his cousin Josiah Quincy, Charles Francis Adams met Joseph Smith, the founder of the Church of Jesus Christ and the Latter Day Saints, in Nauvoo, Illinois, and received a copy of the Book of Mormon which had previously belonged to Smith's first wife, Emma Smith. The book is now in the archive collections of Adams National Historical Park. At the visit, Smith showed Adams and Quincy four Egyptian mummies and ancient papyri. Adams was not impressed by Smith, and wrote in his diary entry that day, "Such a man is a study not for himself, but as serving to show what turns the human mind will sometimes take. And herafter if I should live, I may compare the results of this delusion with the condition in which I saw it and its mountebank apostle."

Later life
Back in Boston, Adams declined the presidency of Harvard University, but became one of its overseers in 1869. In 1870 he built the first presidential library in the United States to honor his father John Quincy Adams. The Stone Library includes over 14,000 books written in twelve languages. The library is at Peacefield (also known as the "Old House") which is now part of Adams National Historical Park in Quincy, Massachusetts.

In 1876, Adams ran unsuccessfully for Governor of Massachusetts.

During the 1876 Electoral College controversy, Adams sided with Democrat Samuel J. Tilden over Republican Rutherford B. Hayes for the White House.

Personal life

On September 3, 1829, he married Abigail Brown Brooks (1808–1889), whose father was shipping magnate Peter Chardon Brooks (1767–1849).  She had two sisters, Charlotte, who was married to Edward Everett, a Massachusetts politician, and Ann, who was married to Nathaniel Frothingham, a Unitarian minister.  Together, they were the parents of:

 Louisa Catherine Adams (1831–1870), who married Charles Kuhn
 John Quincy Adams II (1833–1894)
 Charles Francis Adams Jr. (1835–1915)
 Henry Brooks Adams (1838–1918)
 Arthur George Adams (1841–1846), who died young
 Mary Gardiner Adams (1845–1928), who married Dr. Henry Parker Quincy
 Peter Chardon Brooks Adams (1848–1927)

Adams died in Boston on November 21, 1886, at the age of 79, and was interred in Mount Wollaston Cemetery, Quincy. He was the last surviving child of John Quincy Adams.

His wife Abigail's "health and spirits" worsened after her husband's death, and she died at Peacefield on June 6, 1889.

References
Notes

Sources
 Adams, Jr., Charles Francis, Charles Francis Adams, Boston and New York: Houghton, Mifflin and Company, 1900.
 Butterfield, L. H. et al., eds., The Adams Papers (1961– ). Multivolume letterpress edition of all letters to and from major members of the Adams family, plus their diaries; still incomplete.
 Donald, Aida Dipace and Donald, David Herbert, eds., Diary of Charles Francis Adams (2 vols.). Harvard University Press, 1964.
 Duberman, Martin. Charles Francis Adams, 1807–1886. Houghton Mifflin Company, 1961, reissued by Stanford University Press, 1968.
 Egerton, Douglas R. Heirs of an Honored Name: The Decline of the Adams Family and the Rise of Modern America. Basic Books, 2019.

External links

 
 Appleton's Biography edited by Stanley L. Klos
 
 
 Charles Francis Adams, Sr. Civil War era diaries Digital Edition
 Nagel, Paul. Descent from Glory: Four Generations of the John Adams Family. Cambridge: Harvard University Press, 1999.
 Texas and the Massachusetts Resolutions, by Charles Francis Adams, published 1844, hosted by the Portal to Texas History
 Selected diplomatic Letters of the Lincoln administration at Ford's Theatre site, including several to or from Adams
Mount Wollaston Cemetery Tour (includes grave image)

|-

|-

|-

|-

1807 births
1886 deaths
People from Beacon Hill, Boston
Politicians from Boston
Lawyers from Boston
Adams, Charles Francis I
Thomas Johnson family
American people of English descent
Massachusetts Whigs
Massachusetts Free Soilers
Republican Party members of the United States House of Representatives from Massachusetts
1848 United States vice-presidential candidates
1872 United States vice-presidential candidates
Massachusetts state senators
Members of the Massachusetts House of Representatives
Ambassadors of the United States to the United Kingdom
Massachusetts lawyers
Politicians from Quincy, Massachusetts
Children of presidents of the United States
19th-century American diplomats
Harvard College alumni
Fellows of the American Academy of Arts and Sciences
Members of the American Philosophical Society
People of Massachusetts in the American Civil War